Granite Peak Ski Resort is a ski area located in Rib Mountain State Park in the Town of Rib Mountain, Marathon County, Wisconsin, south of Wausau. Granite Peak is the third tallest ski area in the Midwest, after Mount Bohemia (900 ft.) in Michigan's Upper Peninsula and Lutsen Mountain (825 ft.) on Minnesota's north shore of Lake Superior. It is ten miles (16 km) north-northeast of Central Wisconsin Airport.

When the ski area opened on the slopes of Rib Mountain in 1937, it was one of the first ski areas in North America. Stowe in Vermont had opened a few years earlier in 1934. Sun Valley in Idaho had become the nation's first ski resort in the western states in 1936.

Skiing on Rib Mountain has been expanded significantly since 2000 when Granite Peak Ski Area took over ski area operations, increasing to 58 runs, with seven new chairlifts and a new base village.

Rib Mountain State Park in which Granite Peak operates under a 30 year lease recently announced a new Master Plan which will add an additional 125 acres of terrain to the ski area footprint with plans for an additional two lifts and 8 additional trails.  Four trails and a lift will be added in the plan to the east and four trails and a lift will be added in the west.  Mountain biking, hiking and trails encircling the park are also in the plans for the future.

References

External links 

Tourist attractions in Marathon County, Wisconsin
Ski areas and resorts in Wisconsin
Buildings and structures in Marathon County, Wisconsin
Tourist attractions in Wisconsin